The Atlantic Coast Line Railroad's DuPont—Lakeland Line (R Line) was a historic rail line in southern Georgia and the northern west coast of Florida.    On employee timetables, the line was actually divided into the DuPont—High Springs Line (which was part of the company's Waycross District) and the High Springs—Lakeland Line (which was part of the company's Ocala District).  The line was primarily used for freight, though some passenger services ran on parts of it in Florida.  While parts of the line were built as early as 1863, the full line was not complete until 1913.  Parts of the line in Florida are still active today.

Route Description
The DuPont—Lakeland Line began in DuPont, Georgia at the Atlantic Coast Line's Waycross—Thomasville Line. From DuPont, it proceeded south into Florida and passing through Live Oak and Branford.  From Branford, the line turned southeast to High Springs, where the Atlantic Coast Line operated a major freight yard.

From High Springs, the line continued south to Newberry, Williston, Dunnellon, Inverness, and Dade City before coming to an end just south of their Lakeland Yard at Lakeland Junction, where it connected with the Atlantic Coast Line's main line.

The DuPont—Lakeland Line connected with the Atlantic Coast Line's High Springs—Croom Line in both locations, the Thomasville—Dunnellon Line in Dunnellon, the St. Petersburg Line in Trilby, and the Vitis—Tampa Line at Vitis Junction.

Branches
The line also had three smaller branch lines.  The Lake City Branch ran from Lake City Junction (between Branford and High Springs) to Lake City.  The Ocala Branch ran from Rainbow Falls east to Ocala, and the Homosassa Branch (also known as the Crystal River Branch) ran from just south of Dunnellon to Crystal River and Homosassa.

History

Construction and early years

The DuPont—Lakeland Line was built in segments from 1863 to 1913 with most of the line being built by the Atlantic Coast Line's predecessor railroads.

The north end of the line from DuPont to Live Oak, Florida was the first segment of the line to open.  It opened in 1863 and was originally the Florida Division of the Atlantic and Gulf Railroad.  It was the first railroad line to cross the Georgia/Florida border.  The Atlantic and Gulf Railroad later became the Savannah, Florida and Western Railway, which was the main railroad of Henry B. Plant's system or railroads.  Plant then sought to expand his railroad system further into Florida and hoped to reach Charlotte Harbor.  He then chartered the Live Oak and Rowlands Bluff Railroad and the Live Oak, Tampa and Charlotte Harbor Railroad to continue the line from Live Oak via High Springs to Gainesville, which opened in 1883 (track from High Springs to Gainesville would become part of the High Springs—Croom Line).  The Live Oak, Tampa and Charlotte Harbor Railroad also built the Lake City Branch.  In 1893, track was built from High Springs south to Archer.

The first segment of the line on the south end was built in 1884 from Lakeland north to Pemberton Ferry (later known as Croom).  This segment was built by the South Florida Railroad and was the northern leg of their Pemberton Ferry Branch.  

In 1887, the Silver Springs, Ocala and Gulf Railroad (SSO&G) built the segment of the line from Juliette (known today as Rainbow Falls) south to Dunnellon as part of their network. The SSO&G also built track to Ocala and Homosassa at the same time (which became the Ocala and Homosassa branches).  One of the early organizers of the SSO&G was John F. Dunn, for whom Dunnellon is partially named for. In 1891, SSO&G built track from Dunnellon south to Inverness.  At the same time, the South Florida Railroad extended their Pemberton Ferry Branch north to Inverness, linking the two railroads.  In 1893, the SSO&G built track from Rainbow Falls north to Morriston.  

The South Florida Railroad and the Silver Springs, Ocala and Gulf Railroad were incorporated into the Plant System in 1893 and 1901 respectively.  In 1902, the Plant System was bought by the Atlantic Coast Line Railroad.  The Atlantic Coast Line would then built track from Archer to Morriston in 1913, which was the final link in what would become the DuPont—Lakeland Line (R Line).

Height of operation

The DuPont—Lakeland Line would become a busy route for the Atlantic Coast Line in the 1920s.  During the decade, both High Springs Yard and Lakeland Yard were expanded.  The line was also double tracked between Dunnellon and Vitis Junction in 1928.  This was due to increased traffic between the newly-built Perry Cutoff (which connected to the line just north of Dunnellon) and the Vitis—Tampa Line (which connected to the line at Vitis Junction and provided a direct route to Tampa).  Three round trip passenger trains ran this section of the line for much of its history.  The Southland ran the line daily from the Perry Cutoff to Tampa via Vitis Junction with stops at Dunnellon, Inverness, Trilby and Dade City.  The Atlantic Coast Line's West Coast Champion and an additional local passenger train also ran the line daily between Croom and Trilby (where they continued southwest to St. Petersburg).  The Southland was discontinued in 1957.

In 1941, the Homosassa Branch was abandoned between Homosassa and Cutlers.  More of the branch was abandoned between Cutlers and Crystal River in the 1960s.  The Ocala and Lake City Branches were also abandoned in the 1960s. 

By the 1950s, a considerable amount of freight traffic was also running the line.  The line was the Atlantic Coast Line's primary route for freight trains running between Waycross, Georgia and Tampa, Florida.  At least two through freight trains ran the line round-trip daily from DuPont to Vitis Junction on their route from Waycross to Tampa with a stop at High Springs Yard.  One additional through freight train also ran round-trip daily from High Springs to Tampa via Vitis Junction and another through freight train ran from High Springs to Lakeland round-trip daily.  Separate local freight trains also ran from DuPont to High Springs and from High Springs to Lakeland three days a week.  Local freight trains also ran on the Lake City and Crystal River branches several times a week.

Great Train Wreck of 1956

On October 18, 1956, a head-on collision between two Atlantic Coast Line Railroad freight trains occurred near Pineola killing four crewmen.  The crash is known as "The Great Train Wreck of 1956," and signpost at the site of the crash on the Withlacoochee State Trail memorializes the event today.

Later years
The Atlantic Coast Line became the Seaboard Coast Line Railroad (SCL) in 1967 after merging with their rival, the Seaboard Air Line Railroad (SAL).  At the time of the merger, the Seaboard Air Line's Brooksville Subdivision closely paralleled the High Springs—Lakeland Line though Inverness, Dunnellon, and Morriston.  The lines even crossed each other twice (once just south of Dunnellon and again near Rainbow Springs where the Juliette Falls Golf Course's driving range is currently located).

The merged company adopted the Seaboard Air Line's method of naming their lines as subdivisions.  As a result, the DuPont—High Springs Line north of High Springs was designated as the DuPont Subdivision on employee timetables , the West Coast Subdivision from High Springs to Vitis Junction (which also included the former Vitis—Tampa Line), and the Vitis Subdivision from Vitis Junction to Lakeland.  The Crystal River Branch was designated the Crystal River Subdivision.

Much of the parallel Seaboard Air Line track from Archer to Inverness was also abandoned in the wake of the merger due to its proximity to the West Coast Subdivision.  A local passenger train continued to run the line the short distance from Croom to Trilby on its route from Jacksonville to St. Petersburg until 1971, when all of the Seaboard Coast Line's passenger trains were taken over by Amtrak. 

In 1980, the Seaboard Coast Line's parent company merged with the Chessie System, creating the CSX Corporation.  The CSX Corporation initially operated the Chessie and Seaboard Systems separately until 1986, when they were merged into CSX Transportation.  Lakeland Yard closed in the 1980s and traffic was then relocated to nearby Winston Yard just four miles west of Lakeland Junction on the A Line (the former Atlantic Coast Line Main Line).  By 1982, the Crystal River Subdivision was abandoned south of Red Level Junction.   

In 1987, only a year after completing the transition to CSX, the company abandoned 46 miles of the West Coast Subdivision between Gulf Junction (in Dunnellon) to its connection with the S Line at Owensboro.  This segment has since become the Withlacoochee State Trail, the longest rail trail in Florida.  CSX abandoned the line from DuPont to High Springs in 1988.

From 1990 to 2004, Amtrak operated service on the line between Lakeland and Owensboro which also ran on the S Line further north.  This service was operated by the Silver Star, Silver Palm, and the Palmetto at various times through this period.

Current operations
Today, the former DuPont—Lakeland line still exists in two segments.  CSX still operates the line from Owensboro to Lakeland.  It is part of CSX's Wildwood Subdivision (which also includes the S Line to the north) north of Vitis Junction and is still the Vitis Subdivision south of there.  No passenger service has operated on the line since 2004.

The line north of Dunnellon and the remaining branch to Red Level was taken over by the shortline Florida Northern Railroad in 1988.  The Florida Northern abandoned the line north of Newberry to High Springs in 2014, which was the last railroad track remaining in the once busy railroad hub of High Springs.'

The former Lakeland Yard at the south end of the line is now the site of Bonnet Springs Park.

Historic Stations

See also
Perry Cutoff
Main Line (Atlantic Coast Line Railroad)
High Springs—Croom Line
Lakeland—Fort Myers Line

References

Atlantic Coast Line Railroad
Rail infrastructure in Florida